Jeon Soo-jin (born November 8, 1988) is a South Korean actress. Born in Seoul but raised in Jeju Island, she was studying design at Konkuk University in 2008 when she began doing part-time work as a model for the fashion magazines Shibuya and CeCi. Jeon made her acting debut in 2012 and has since starred in films and television series, notably Godsend (2014) where she played her first leading role.

Filmography

Film

Television series

Variety show

Music video

Awards and nominations

References

External links

1988 births
Living people
South Korean television actresses
South Korean film actresses
21st-century South Korean actresses
South Korean female models
People from Jeju Province
Konkuk University alumni